Caryocolum arenbergeri is a moth of the family Gelechiidae. It is found in Portugal and Spain.

References

Moths described in 1989
arenbergeri
Moths of Europe